Walter Presents is a video-on-demand service of the UK's Channel 4, part of its All 4 online platform. Launched on 3 January 2016, it specialises in foreign-language drama and comedy with English subtitles. It is named after Walter Iuzzolino, who selects its content. The service was later offered as an ad-free subscription service in the United States in March 2017, and in Australia via a Foxtel service in November 2017. It launched in New Zealand in May 2020 as part of free streaming service TVNZ OnDemand (now TVNZ+). It has been available in Italy as an on-demand service since September 2018 through a deal between Global and Discovery Networks. In 2022 Walter Presents launched in Sweden, Norway, Denmark, and Finland on the premium streaming service C More.

Production
In the UK, the service is a partnership between Channel 4 and Global Series Network. It is free to view and supported by advertisements. Walter Iuzzolino began reviewing potential content for the service two years before its launch, viewing 3,500 hours of television in all.

The service aims to avoid so-called art-house programming in favour of more mainstream productions that compete with Netflix and Amazon Prime for audiences already familiar with such Nordic dramas such as The Bridge. Iuzzolino set three criteria for selection: the show must be popular in its native country, as were Homeland and House of Cards in the United States; it must be "award-winning or already critically acclaimed"; and it must have "the finest writing, directing and acting that each country has to offer...something worth our time as viewers".

To promote the service, some of the content is also being aired on Channel 4's conventional channels, Channel 4 and More4. From October 2019, Welsh-language channel S4C began to broadcast some Walter Presents series with Welsh subtitles as part of Walter Presents ar gyfer S4C (English: Walter Presents for S4C) with some series available with Welsh subtitles online on S4C Clic, the channel’s on-demand service. 

In the US, Walter Presents is known as Walter's Choice and is presented by PBS.

Programmes

Reception
According to Channel 4, the 11 titles available in the first month attracted 1.1 million views on All 4.

References

External links
 Walter Presents – official site 
 Walter Presents – official site 

Channel 4
Video on demand services